Deh Ban-e Sofla (also Romanized as Deh Bān-e Soflá) is a village in Rezvan Rural District, Jebalbarez District, Jiroft County, Kerman Province, Iran. At the 2006 census, its population was 25, in 6 families.

References 

Populated places in Jiroft County